In Iron Years is a collection of science fiction stories by American writer Gordon R. Dickson.  It was first published by Doubleday in 1980.  Most of the stories originally appeared in the magazines Fantasy and Science Fiction, If, Galaxy Science Fiction and Astounding.

Contents

 "In Iron Years"
 "Homecoming"
 "A Taste of Tenure"
 "The Hours Are Good"
 "Gifts"
 "Zeepsday"
 "Things Which Are Caesar’s"

References

1980 short story collections
Short story collections by Gordon R. Dickson
Doubleday (publisher) books